Ulf Stenlund (born 21 January 1967) is a former tennis player from Sweden, who won one single (1986, Palermo) and one doubles (1987, Bari) title during his professional career. The right-hander reached his career-high ATP singles ranking of world No. 23 in April 1987.

Career finals

Singles (1 title)

Doubles (1 title)

References

External links
 
 

1967 births
Living people
Swedish male tennis players
People from Falun
Sportspeople from Dalarna County